Gunter's chain (also known as Gunter's measurement) is a distance measuring device used for surveying. It was designed and introduced in 1620 by English clergyman and mathematician Edmund Gunter (1581–1626). It enabled plots of land to be accurately surveyed and plotted, for legal and commercial purposes.

Gunter developed an actual measuring chain of 100 links. These, the chain and the link,  became statutory measures in England and subsequently the British Empire.

Description

The  chain is divided into 100 links, usually marked off into groups of 10 by brass rings or tags which simplify intermediate measurement. A quarter chain, or 25 links, measures  and  thus measures a rod (or pole). Ten chains measure a furlong and 80 chains measure a statute mile.

Gunter's chain reconciled two seemingly incompatible systems: the traditional English land measurements, based on the number four, and decimals based on the number 10. Since an acre measured 10 square chains in Gunter's system, the entire process of land area measurement could be computed using measurements in chains, and then converted to acres by dividing the results by 10. Hence 10 chains by 10 chains (100 square chains) equals 10 acres, 5 chains by 5 chains (25 square chains) equals 2.5 acres.

Method

The method of surveying a field or other parcel of land with Gunter's chain is to first determine corners and other significant locations, and then to measure the distance between them, taking two points at a time. The surveyor is assisted by a chainman. A ranging rod (usually a prominently coloured wooden pole) is placed in the ground at the destination point. Starting at the originating point the chain is laid out towards the ranging rod, and the surveyor then directs the chainman to make the chain perfectly straight and pointing directly at the ranging rod. A pin is put in the ground at the forward end of the chain, and the chain is moved forward so that its hind end is at that point, and the chain is extended again towards the destination point. This process is called ranging, or in the US, chaining; it is repeated until the destination rod is reached, when the surveyor notes how many full lengths (chains) have been laid, and he can then directly read how many links (one-hundredth parts of the chain) are in the distance being measured. The chain usually ends in a handle which may or may not be part of the measurement. An inner loop (visible in the NMAH photograph) is the correct place to put the pin for some chains. Many chains were made with the handles as part of the end link and thus were included in the measurement.

The whole process is repeated for all the other pairs of points required, and it is a simple matter to make a scale diagram of the plot of land. The process is surprisingly accurate and requires only very low technology. Surveying with a chain is simple if the land is level and continuous—it is not physically practicable to range across large depressions or significant waterways, for example. On sloping land, the chain was to be "leveled" by raising one end as needed, so that undulations did not increase the apparent length of the side or the area of the tract.

Unit of length

Although link chains were later superseded by the steel ribbon tape (a form of tape measure), its legacy was a new statutory unit of length called the chain, equal to 66 feet (or 100 links). This unit still exists as a location identifier on British railways, as well as in some areas of America. In the United States (US), for example, Public Lands Survey plats are published in the chain unit to maintain the consistency of a two-hundred-year-old database. In the Midwest of the US it is not uncommon to encounter deeds with references to chains, poles, or rod units, especially in farming country. Minor roads surveyed in Australia and New Zealand in the 19th and early 20th centuries are customarily one chain wide.

The length of a cricket pitch is one chain (22 yards).

Similar measuring chains

A similar American system, of lesser popularity, is Ramsden's or the engineer's system, where the chain consists also of 100 links, each one foot (0.3048 m) long. The original of such chains was that constructed, to very high precision, for the measurement of the baselines of the Anglo-French Survey (1784–1790) and the Principal Triangulation of Great Britain.

The even less common Rathborn system, also from the 17th century, is based on a 200-link chain of two rods (33 feet, 10.0584 m) length. Each rod (or perch or pole) consists of 100 links, (1.98 inches, 50.292 mm each), which are called seconds, ten of which make a prime (19.8 inches, 0.503 m).

Vincent Wing made chains with 9.90-inch links, most commonly as 33-foot half-chains of 40 links. These chains were sometimes used in the American colonies, particularly Pennsylvania.

In India, surveying chains  (occasionally 30 metres) in length are used.

The fathom was a common measure used in English mines to describe depth and measure distances in some types of mine. Accordingly a 60 foot, 10 fathom chain was used. The chain consisted of 120 x 6 inch links with numbered tallies at each fathom (six feet).

See also
 Distance measurement

References

External links
How to make a Gunter's Chain
Image from 1675
 Nineteenth century image

Surveying instruments
Units of length
Imperial units
Customary units of measurement in the United States
Length, distance, or range measuring devices